Camilo Becerra (born 10 October 1980) is a three-time Olympic freestyle swimmer from Colombia. He swam from Colombia at the 2000, 2004 and 2008 Olympics.

The 2004 Games saw his highest Olympic finish to date: a tie for 37th in the men's 50m freestyle.

Becerra also swam at the 2007 World Championships.

He graduated from Southern Methodist University in 2006 with a degree in Finance and Economics. Becerra swims for the Fort Worth Area Swim team in Fort Worth Texas and is coached by Ron Forrest.

References

1980 births
Living people
Sportspeople from Cali
Colombian male freestyle swimmers
Olympic swimmers of Colombia
Swimmers at the 2000 Summer Olympics
Swimmers at the 2003 Pan American Games
Swimmers at the 2004 Summer Olympics
Swimmers at the 2008 Summer Olympics
SMU Mustangs men's swimmers
Pan American Games competitors for Colombia
21st-century Colombian people